Lexical may refer to:

Linguistics
 Lexical corpus or lexis, a complete set of all words in a language
 Lexical item, a basic unit of lexicographical classification
 Lexicon, the vocabulary of a person, language, or branch of knowledge
 Lexical (semiotics) or content word, words referring to things, as opposed to having only grammatical meaning
 Lexical verb, a member of an open class of verbs that includes all verbs except auxiliary verbs
 Lexical aspect, a characteristic of the meaning of verbs
 Lexical form, the canonical form of a word, under which it appears in dictionaries
 Lexical definition or dictionary definition, the meaning of a term in common usage
 Lexical semantics, a subfield of linguistic semantics that studies how and what the words of a language denote

Computing
 Lexical analysis, the process of converting a sequence of characters into a sequence of tokens
 Lexical Markup Framework, the ISO standard for natural language processing and machine-readable dictionary lexicons
 Lexical scope, a scope in computer programming

Other uses
 Lexical approach, a method of teaching foreign languages
 Lexical hypothesis, a widely used theory in personality psychology

See also
 Lexeme
 Lexicon (disambiguation)